The Tabriz Central Library, formerly Tabriz National Library, was founded in 1956 by Nakhjavani with help from the people of Tabriz, Iran. It contains several handwritten books. The library is called National because of its non-benefit and non-governmental structure. Initially the library started by the books which are gathered by people specially by Nakhjavani, the building also constructed without any government investment.

The original building was in the vicinity of Ark. After the   revolution the initial building was destroyed by clerical hardliners in 1978 and the books moved to other buildings near to the Golestan Park, when they were destroying the historic Tabriz City Theater building that was placed behind the library building to make a new mosque.

Currently a new modern building is made for the library by the Iranian Ministry of Culture.

References

 http://portal-en.tbzmed.ac.ir/

Libraries established in 1956
Buildings and structures in Tabriz
Libraries in Iran
National libraries
1956 establishments in Iran
Education in Tabriz
Demolished buildings and structures in Iran
Buildings and structures demolished in 1978